The 1984 United States presidential election in Indiana took place on November 6, 1984. All 50 states and the District of Columbia, were part of the 1984 United States presidential election. State voters chose 12 electors to the Electoral College, which selected the president and vice president of the United States. President Ronald Reagan of California won the state of Indiana against former Vice President Walter Mondale of Minnesota by a substantial 23.99% margin. Reagan ran for a second time with incumbent Vice President and former C.I.A. Director George H. W. Bush of Texas, and Mondale ran with Representative Geraldine Ferraro of New York, the first major female candidate for the vice presidency.

The presidential election of 1984 was a rather partisan election in Indiana, with less than one percent of the state voting for third-party candidates, and only two third parties appearing on the ballot. In trend with the state's typically conservative-leaning history, Reagan carried every county in the Hoosier state except for Lake County in the northwest corner. Lake County is part of the Chicago metropolitan area and has a substantial African American population in contrast with the rest of Indiana. Perry County in the southern part of the state was the only other county that failed to give Reagan an absolute majority of the vote.

Reagan won Indiana by a margin of 24%. While Indiana had long been the most Republican-leaning state in the Great Lakes region, Reagan’s performance in the state was somewhat underwhelming, as Indiana was only 5.8% more Republican than the nation at large. (By comparison, when it voted for Barack Obama in 2008, the state was just over 6% to the right of the nation at large.) The election results in Indiana are also reflective of a nationwide reconsolidation of the base for the Republican Party which took place through the 1980s; called by Reagan the "second American Revolution." This was most evident during the 1984 presidential election.

It is speculated that Mondale lost support with voters nearly immediately during the campaign, namely during his acceptance speech at the 1984 Democratic National Convention. There he stated that he intended to increase taxes. To quote Mondale, "By the end of my first term, I will reduce the Reagan budget deficit by two thirds. Let's tell the truth. It must be done, it must be done. Mr. Reagan will raise taxes, and so will I. He won't tell you. I just did." Despite this claimed attempt at establishing truthfulness with the electorate, this promise to raise taxes badly eroded his chances in what had already begun as an uphill battle against the charismatic Ronald Reagan. Reagan also enjoyed high levels of bipartisan support during the 1984 presidential election, both in Indiana, and across the nation at large. Many registered Democrats who voted for Reagan (Reagan Democrats) stated that they had chosen to do so because they associated him with the economic recovery, because of his strong stance on national security issues with Russia, and because they considered the Democrats as "supporting American poor and minorities at the expense of the middle class." These public opinion factors contributed to Reagan's 1984 landslide victory, in Indiana and elsewhere. Reagan's victory came marked the fifth consecutive time that Republicans had carried the state since the 1964 presidential election. This streak would continue for an additional five presidential elections until Barack Obama's victory in 2008.

Democratic platform
Walter Mondale accepted the Democratic nomination for presidency after pulling narrowly ahead of Senator Gary Hart of Colorado and Rev. Jesse Jackson of Illinois – his main contenders during what would be a very contentious Democratic primary. During the campaign, Mondale was vocal about reduction of government spending, and, in particular, was vocal against heightened military spending on the nuclear arms race against the Soviet Union, which was reaching its peak on both sides in the early 1980s.

Taking a (what was becoming the traditional liberal) stance on the social issues of the day, Mondale advocated for gun control, the right to choose regarding abortion, and strongly opposed the repeal of laws regarding institutionalized prayer in public schools. He also criticized Reagan for what he charged was his economic marginalization of the poor, stating that Reagan's reelection campaign was "a happy talk campaign," not focused on the real issues at hand.

A very significant political move during this election: the Democratic Party nominated Representative Geraldine Ferraro to run with Mondale as Vice-President. Ferraro is the first female candidate to receive such a nomination in United States history. She said in an interview at the 1984 Democratic National Convention that this action "opened a door which will never be closed again," speaking to the role of women in politics.

Republican platform
By 1984, Reagan was very popular with voters across the nation as the President who saw them out of the economic stagflation of the early and middle 1970's, and into a period of (relative) economic stability.

The economic success seen under Reagan was politically accomplished (principally) in two ways. The first was initiation of deep tax cuts for the wealthy, and the second was a wide-spectrum of tax cuts for crude oil production and refinement, namely, with the 1980 Windfall profits tax cuts. These policies were augmented with a call for heightened military spending, the cutting of social welfare programs for the poor, and the increasing of taxes on those making less than $50,000 per year. Collectively called "Reaganomics", these economic policies were established through several pieces of legislation passed between 1980 and 1987.

These new tax policies also arguably curbed several existing tax loopholes, preferences, and exceptions. Reaganomics has (along with legislation passed under presidents George H. W. Bush and Bill Clinton) been criticized by many analysts as "setting the stage" for economic troubles in the United States after 2007, such as the Great Recession.

Virtually unopposed during the Republican primaries, Reagan ran on a campaign of furthering his economic policies. Reagan vowed to continue his "war on drugs," passing sweeping legislation after the 1984 election in support of mandatory minimum sentences for drug possession. Furthermore, taking a (what was becoming the traditional conservative) stance on the social issues of the day, Reagan strongly opposed legislation regarding comprehension of gay marriage, abortion, and (to a lesser extent) environmentalism, regarding the final as simply being bad for business.

Results

Results by county

See also
 United States presidential elections in Indiana

References

Indiana
1984 Indiana elections
1984